William Fraser (1827–1901) was a 19th-century Liberal Party Member of Parliament in the Auckland Region, New Zealand.

Biography

He was born in Inverness, Scotland, in 1827.

He was Mayor of Thames in 1882–1887. He represented the Thames electorate in Parliament from 1884 to 1890.

In the 1890 general election, he was defeated for the Te Aroha electorate by William Shepherd Allen. Allen's election was declared void on 3 April 1891. Fraser won the resulting 9 July 1891 by-election and represented the electorate until the end of the term in 1893.

Notes

References

1827 births
1901 deaths
Members of the New Zealand House of Representatives
New Zealand Liberal Party MPs
Mayors of Thames
New Zealand MPs for North Island electorates
Unsuccessful candidates in the 1890 New Zealand general election
19th-century New Zealand politicians